Gurka may refer to:

 Gurka (card game), a north European card game
 Gurkha, a native of Nepal
 Gurka or Gurcu, a Hungarian nobleman